Mario Vekić (born 27 December 1982) is a Croatian rower who competes in the sculls events.

References 
 
 

1982 births
Living people
Croatian male rowers
Sportspeople from Osijek
Olympic rowers of Croatia
Rowers at the 2008 Summer Olympics
Rowers at the 2012 Summer Olympics
Mediterranean Games silver medalists for Croatia
Competitors at the 2009 Mediterranean Games
Mediterranean Games medalists in rowing
European Rowing Championships medalists